Andhra Hendthi (Kannada: ಆಂಧ್ರ ಹೆಂಡ್ತಿ) is a 2000 Indian Kannada film,  directed by  A. R. Babu and produced by N. L. Narayanappa. The film stars Ramya Krishna, Madan Mallu, Anant Nag and Thriller Manju in lead roles. The film had musical score by Shivamaya.

Cast

Ramya Krishna
Madan Mallu
Anant Nag
Thriller Manju
Jayanthi
Ashalatha
Doddanna
Karibasavaiah
Mimicri Dayanand
Shobhraj
Avinash
Tennis Krishna
Shani Mahadevappa
Alphonsa
Pushpa Swamy
Soumya
Mayur Patel
Rekha
Sunitha
Lakshmi

Soundtrack

References

External links
 

2000 films
2000s Kannada-language films
Films scored by Rajesh Ramnath